Mepkin Abbey is a Trappist monastery in Berkeley County, South Carolina. The abbey is located near Moncks Corner, at the junction of the two forks of the Cooper River northwest of Charleston, and is located in the Diocese of Charleston.

History
The area has been known as Mepkin for centuries, and was originally the estate of several historic families. The first record of the name was a 1681 grant to the sons of Sir John Coleton, one of the Lords Proprietary of South Carolina. In 1762 one of his descendants sold the land to Henry Laurens of Charleston. Laurens built his home there, and it was known as the Mepkin Plantation. 

After a few generations, the Laurens family sold the property, and it passed through several hands. In 1936 the well-known publisher Henry R. Luce bought the property. The plantation, which was created from several smaller plantations, contained over 7200 acres when Luce bought the property for a reported $150,000. When the Luces bought the plantation, Laurnes' house was already gone; the then-current house had been built in 1906. New York architect Edward Durell Stone travelled to Mepkin in 1936 to design a new house for the Luces. His wife, Clare Boothe Luce, commissioned and built an extensive landscape garden there known as the Mepkin Garden. In 1949 the Luces donated a large part of the property, including the garden, to the Trappist Order's Gethsemani Abbey.

Twenty-nine monks of the Order of Cistercians of the Strict Observance (Trappists) came from Gethsemani, Kentucky, to found the new Mepkin Abbey. With a few limitations, the Abbey and the Mepkin Gardens are open to the public on a daily basis. The monastery grounds include a graveyard containing the ashes of Henry Laurens, as well as the graves of John Laurens, Clare Boothe Luce, and Henry Luce. Its gardens are now known as the Mepkin Abbey Botanical Garden.

Egg farming controversy

In February 2007, People for the Ethical Treatment of Animals released video of Mepkin Abbey's battery cage egg operation, showing debeaked hens crowded inside battery cages and a monk discussing the practice of forced molting.  PETA cited earlier statements by Pope Benedict XVI on factory farming, in which the pontiff criticized the "industrial use of creatures, so that geese are fed in such a way as to produce as large a liver as possible, or hens live so packed together that they become just caricatures of birds" as being incompatible with Biblical teachings on animals.  Mepkin Abbey defended itself by citing their compliance with the animal welfare standards of the United Egg Producers.  Furthering the controversy, it was discovered shortly after the release of the video that many scenes shown in the video, such as those of dead chickens of the floor, were actually shot at a separate facility rather than at Mepkin Abbey. In December 2007, Mepkin announced on its website that it would phase out the egg production operation which had been its main income, citing the controversy and its disturbance of their monastic way of life. They eventually decided on a mushroom production operation.

Leaders of Mepkin Abbey

Abbots/Superiors

References

External links
The Mepkin Abbey web site
Mepkin article on their new mushroom production replacing the egg production

Trappist monasteries in the United States
Buildings and structures in Berkeley County, South Carolina
Tourist attractions in Berkeley County, South Carolina
Roman Catholic churches in South Carolina
Roman Catholic Diocese of Charleston